The Icha is a river in Severny District of Novosibirsk Oblast, Russia. Its length is 257 km (160 mi), with a drainage basin of 3570  square kilometres. The river is a right tributary of the Om.

References

Rivers of Novosibirsk Oblast